Slatina is a village in Slovakia near Levice. The village is known for the Slatina, mineral water extracted here.

First written reference to the village dates from 1245. A spa has existed here since the 18th century.

Villages and municipalities in Levice District